The "Citie of Henricus"—also known as Henricopolis, Henrico Town or Henrico—was a settlement in Virginia founded by Sir Thomas Dale in 1611 as an alternative to the swampy and dangerous area around the original English settlement at Jamestown, Virginia. It was named for Henry, Prince of Wales (1594–1612), the eldest son of King James I.

The site of Henricus is located on a neck of land called Farrar's Island, which later became part of the Shire of Henrico (1634) and was renamed Henrico County in 1637.

Today, the settlement is interpreted via Henricus Historical Park, a living history museum.

History
Henricus was one of the earliest English colonial settlements in the New World. It was located on the neck of a peninsula later known as Farrar's Island, a former curl of the James River about 12 miles southeast of the modern city of Richmond, Virginia. At the time, the First Anglo-Powhatan War was raging, and the Indian tribes of Virginia offered continuous resistance to colonial settlement, largely orchestrated by native leader Nemattanew — or as the colonists knew him, "Jack-of-the-Feather". Prior to the development of Richmond, Henricus was one of the westernmost outlying developments from the Colony of Virginia's fortified capital downriver at Jamestown. In 1612–1613, a facility known as "Mt. Malady" was built nearby; it was the first hospital in the English colonies of North America.

This settlement was near where Pocahontas grew up among the Appomattoc tribe of the Powhatan Confederacy. Reverend Alexander Whitaker converted her to Christianity during her captivity at Henricus under Sir Thomas Dale, deputy governor of the colony. She met colonist John Rolfe during this time and they married on April 5, 1614. Rolfe's longtime friend, Richard Buck, presided at their wedding. They lived together across the river at the Varina Farms Plantation. Their mixed-race son, Thomas Rolfe (named for Sir Thomas Dale, deputy governor of the colony of Virginia), was born on the plantation. His descendants were among many of the First Families of Virginia (FFV).

Proposed college at Henricus
The Virginia Company tried to found the first institution of higher education in British America. In 1618, they obtained a royal charter from King James I of England for a proposed University of Henrico. In 1619, the historic First Virginia General Assembly meet at Jamestown and passed their 5th Petition: "Send men to erect the Colledge", referred to it as "A worke of Conversion", and set aside land for it adjacent to and above Henricus. In 1619, Henricus was also incorporated into the City of Henrico. The fort was abandoned by governor's orders during the Indian massacre of 1622, and largely destroyed by the Powhatan afterwards.

By 1623, more settlers occupied the college land than before the massacre. The next year James I dissolved the Virginia Company, seizing its assets and transforming the proprietary colony into a royal one. The Crown controlled it from then on.

In 1693, the College of William and Mary was established in Williamsburg under a new charter granted by the joint English monarchs King William III and Queen Mary II. A plaque on the Wren Building, the college's first structure, ascribes the institution's origin to "the college proposed at Henrico".

Today

The area later saw action during the American Revolutionary War. During the American Civil War, the narrow neck of Farrar's Island on which Henricus was located was excavated to create the Dutch Gap Canal in an attempt to bypass Confederate defensive batteries along the James River. The channel was later widened, and the old river channel silted up, forming what is now the  Dutch Gap Conservation Area.

In 1922, the former location of Henricus south of the Dutch Gap Canal was annexed from Henrico County by Chesterfield County. Over time, the exact location of the former town of Henricus became uncertain. The  archeological site in Chesterfield County was listed as Henrico on the U.S. National Register of Historic Places in 1972. Though archaeological evidence of the actual settlement has not been found (due to the creation of Dutch Gap and other disturbances nearby), a reconstruction based on historical evidence of the settlement has been created nearby as a living history museum, Henricus Historical Park.

In popular culture 
This article was the topic of conversation in the fourth episode of series two of the web series "Two Of These People Are Lying" hosted by The Technical Difficulties.

References

Further reading 
David A. Price, Love and Hate in Jamestown: John Smith, Pocahontas, and the Start of A New Nation, Alfred A. Knopf, 2003
 Philip A. Bruce, Institutional History of Virginia in the Seventeenth Century (Volumes I and II),  Kessinger Publishing, 2006

External links 
 
 Virginia.org: entry on Henricus Historical Park

English colonization of the Americas
Archaeological sites on the National Register of Historic Places in Virginia
National Register of Historic Places in Chesterfield County, Virginia
Henrico County, Virginia
Museums in Chesterfield County, Virginia
Former English colonies
Populated places on the James River (Virginia)
History of Richmond, Virginia
History of the Thirteen Colonies
Populated places established in 1611
Open-air museums in Virginia
Living museums in Virginia
1611 establishments in the Thirteen Colonies